Asperity may refer to:

 Asperity (faults), a "stuck" part of a geologic fault
 Asperity Mountain, a mountain in British Columbia, Canada
 , a British coaster in service 1945-67
 Asperity (materials science), the unevenness of a surface, in physics and in seismology,
 Asperity (geotechnical engineering)